Captain Birdseye, also known as Captain Iglo, is the advertising mascot for the Birds Eye (known as Iglo in parts of Europe) frozen food brand founded by Clarence Birdseye. Appearing in numerous television and billboard commercials, he has been played or modelled by various actors and is generally depicted as a clean living, older sailor with a white beard, dressed in merchant naval uniform and a white polo neck sweater and with a West Country pirate-style accent.

History

The mascot is a reference to the brand's extensive and well-known range of frozen seafood products, of which fish fingers is probably the most-widely known. Because the Birds Eye brand is marketed to families, many of the advertising campaigns feature Captain Birdseye as having a 'crew' composed mostly of children in the preteen to teenage age groups, encouraging brand loyalty from children and emphasising to parents the convenience of serving the company's products. An advertising campaign in the UK in 2005 features Captain Birdseye categorically proclaiming that Birds Eye frozen ready-made meals contain no artificial flavors or preservatives, with obvious references to the products being healthy and nutritious to children.
The actor most associated with Captain Birdseye was John Hewer, who played the character from 1967 to 1998. His tenure was interrupted by a hiatus in 1971, when the fictitious Captain was killed off by Birdseye, with an "obituary" in The Times announcements section:

Birdseye decided to resurrect the character three years later, on 22 July 1974, to bolster its brand against rising competition and rising prices resulting from the Cod Wars. Hewer was brought back to portray the Captain, who soon recaptured his popularity with children. In 1993, he was named in a poll as the most recognisable captain on the planet after Captain Cook, also in the same year, he appeared on Noel's House Party from the 2nd series finale on 13 March 1993.

In 1998 Captain Birdseye became a much younger, rugged, dark-haired man with designer stubble and a miniature submarine, who indulged in far more action-packed adventures accompanied by his pet pelican named Jess. This version played by Thomas Pescod did not last long however, and the old version soon returned, played by Martyn Reid from 2002 until 2007.
From 2008 until his death in 2012 German taxi driver Gerd Deutschmann played the captain.
From early 2016 to late 2016 the captain was played by Mitch Commins, followed by Denis Parlato from mid 2016 to early 2017. Mark Fletcher took over the role in 2017 until early 2018, when Italian-born actor and seafarer Riccardo Acerbi was cast as Captain Birdseye in a £8m revamp of the brand and character in January 2018. The new Captain's "rugged good looks" were a huge hit with the British press.

In South Africa, Captain Birdseye had been played by another British actor, Larry Taylor.

Actors
Captain Birds Eye portrayed through the years.
1967 - 1998: John Hewer
1998 - 2001: Thomas Pescod
2002 - 2007: Martyn Reid
2008 - 2012: Gerd Deutschmann
Early 2016 - late 2016: Mitch Commins
Mid 2016 - early 2017: Denis Parlato
2017 - 2018: Mark Fletcher
2018- : Riccardo Acerbi

Acquisitions 
The brand was acquired by Anglo-Dutch food conglomerate Unilever, and was held until 2006, when it was sold to a private equity firm, Permira.

Allusions
 In the UK television sitcom Only Fools and Horses, Derek Trotter once mockingly called Uncle Albert "Captain Birdseye", in reference to their similar appearances and Uncle Albert's naval past.
 The Goodies parodied the adverts as 'Captain Fishface', ending with a note saying "Captain Fishface has your children.  If you want them back send 2000 wrappers from Fishface Cod Pieces, but make it quick (after all...ye don't know what goes into my rissoles, do ye?...)"
 Spoofs of the Birds Eye commercials featuring "Captain Fishy, the man with the fishy fingers" were featured by DJ Steve Wright on his BBC Radio 1 programme in the UK in the early 1990s.
 The Italian comedic heavy metal band Nanowar of Steel recorded a song called "Der Fluch des Kapt’n Iglo," featuring a humorous interpretation of the mascot's adventures, which will be featured on their upcoming album, "Italian Folk Metal."
 In the UK television game show 8 Out of 10 Cats Does Countdown, Joe Wilkinson presented a poem in which he joked about naming a stranger's penis Captain Birdseye "because it looks like it's wearing a polo neck and winking at me".
 In the UK television sitcom Peep Show, Jeff mockingly compares Mark's fisherman costume to Captain Birdseye in the episode "New Year's Eve."

International Names
In Germany, Austria and Switzerland he is known as "Käpt'n Iglo".

In The Netherlands as "Kapitein Iglo"

In France and Belgium as "Captain Iglo" (the word "captain" being in English).

In Spain as "Capitán Iglo"

In Portugal as "Capitão Iglo".

In Italy as "Capitan Findus".

In Greece as Kaptain Iglo (Κάπταιν Ίγκλο).

References

Mascots introduced in 1967
Male characters in advertising
Food advertising characters
Fictional military captains
Fictional sailors